The Villa Aronsohn is an historic house in downtown Bydgoszcz, at 1 Śniadeckich street.

Location
The building stands on the corner of Śniadeckich street and Gdańska Street in Bydgoszcz. In the vicinity, stands the memorial of Marian Rejewski.

History
The building was built in the 1860s for Jewish banker Lewin Louis Aronsohn (1850-1928). He was famous in Bromberg as a banker, Jewish active member and politician. As a philanthropist, he donated funds for building an orphanage and funded the work of sculptor Ferdinand Lepcke creating the statue The archer unveiled 18 October 1910, now a symbol of Bydgoszcz.
In 1918, Lewin Louis Aronsohn was recognized and praised as Honorary Citizen of Bydgoszcz.

In 1994-1995, the building has been refurbished and since 1995, it houses the seat of the Municipal Housing Administration in Bydgoszcz.().

A recent restoration occurred in January 2016.

Architecture
The villa was built in the Neo-Renaissance style.

It had originally a garden on the southern side. On the eastern facade is located a small terrace, hanging over pilasters. Between the windows two half-columns are supporting the entablature and a decorative frieze. The roof is also adorned with a decorative frieze at the eaves.

Until today, facades have kept tonda with putti reliefs. Inside, rich neo-rococo furnishings can be found: stoves, fireplaces, stuccoes, stained glasses, oak panelling and a wooden coffered ceiling in the office.

The building has been put on the Kuyavian-Pomeranian Voivodeship Heritage List, Nr.601416 Reg.A/889, on 15 June 1993.

Gallery

See also

 Bydgoszcz
 Lewin Louis Aronsohn
 Jan and Jędrzej Śniadecki Street in Bydgoszcz
 Zygmunt Krasiński Street in Bydgoszcz
 Gdanska Street in Bydgoszcz
  Downtown district in Bydgoszcz

References

External links 
  Bydgoszcz  Municipal Housing Administration

Bibliography 
  

Cultural heritage monuments in Bydgoszcz
Buildings and structures on Gdańska Street, Bydgoszcz
Villas in Bydgoszcz
Houses completed in 1866
1866 establishments in Prussia